Harco may refer to:

 Harco, Illinois, USA
 Harcó, a village in Pănet. Romania
 Harco, Inc., an American drugstore chain acquired by Rite Aid Corporation
 Harco (Harlow Chemical Company ), a chemical company based in Harlow, UK. Now part of Synthomer
 Harco Steel